Metcalf Spur is a rock spur,  long, which extends from Shapeless Mountain northwest to Pākira Nunatak on the plateau of the Willett Range of Victoria Land. It was named by the Advisory Committee on Antarctic Names in 2005 after Altie Metcalf, Budget and Planning Officer, Office of Polar Programs, National Science Foundation, from 1995 to 2005.

References

Mountains of Victoria Land
Willett Range